Opeatogenys is a genus of clingfishes. The two species occur in the eastern Atlantic Ocean with one being found also in the Mediterranean Sea.

Species
There are currently two recognized species in this genus:
 Opeatogenys cadenati Briggs, 1957
 Opeatogenys gracilis (Canestrini, 1864)

References

 
Gobiesocidae